The Sculptress (1993) is a crime novel by English writer Minette Walters. She won an Edgar and a Macavity Award for the book.  The novel was adapted as a BBC-TV series in 1996, starring Pauline Quirke as Olive Martin.

Synopsis
Olive Martin – a 28-year-old, morbidly obese woman – was imprisoned for life after police found her cradling the shattered bodies of her mother and sister, having previously dismembered them and rearranged their limbs into abstract shapes on the floor, a crime for which she was nicknamed "the Sculptress". Troubled journalist Rosalind Leigh, under pressure from her publisher to produce new material, reluctantly agrees to write a book about Olive and – whilst conducting interviews with the prisoner – gradually comes to believe that she is concealing something, maybe even her own innocence. In her quest to discover the truth Rosalind enlists the help of Hal Hawksley. He is an ex-policeman who investigated the case originally and is still haunted by some of its aspects.

Television adaptation
In 1996, this story was adapted for television by the BBC. The cast featured Pauline Quirke as Olive, Caroline Goodall as Rosalind and Christopher Fulford as Hal.

External links 

1993 British novels
Novels by Minette Walters
Edgar Award-winning works
Macavity Award-winning works
Macmillan Publishers books
British novels adapted into television shows
Television shows based on British novels
British crime television series
BBC television dramas